Operation Christmas Drop is a 2020 American Christmas romantic comedy film directed by Martin Wood from a screenplay by Gregg Rossen and Brian Sawyer. The film stars Kat Graham and Alexander Ludwig and is loosely based on the real-life U.S. Air Force Operation Christmas Drop humanitarian mission.

The film was released on November 5, 2020, by Netflix.

Plot
Erica, a congressional assistant in Washington, DC, is tasked with investigating a US Air Force base in Guam. The ultimate goal is to finding a reason to justify its closure.

Andrew is the Air Force captain chosen to show Erica around the USAF base to convince her that it should remain open. She arrives two hours earlier than expected, then ditches him at her first oportunity to try to explore on her own.

The base has a yearly tradition of airlifting goods to the small islands of Micronesia for Christmas. Andrew shows Erica around the base and various islands, explaining how they gather local donations of food and money, proving that the base's resources, thus American  tax dollars, are not being spent here. 

An example is given of how a shipment of 10 fir trees arrive there at no cost. Firstly, Andrew's Oregon friend donated the trees, and they come via several connections through military flights. The trees are traded in a Guam hotel for sheets and food donations.

At the base's big solar-powered fundraising event, the rest of Erica's skepticism dissipates and she and Andrew have a moment. The next day, as the care packages are being assembled, news of a serious typhoon comes to Guam. The planes are grounded, but Erica tells them to keep the faith.

The weather clears, and Erica opts to disobey her congresswoman's orders to head back to DC. Just before the planes are set to takeoff, she shows up to again insist she leave. Erica stands up to her, suggesting she also participate. The experience inspires her, revitalizing her Christmas spirit and demonstrating that the tradition is worthwhile and the base should not be closed. 

Romance between Erica and Andrew blooms during these events.

Cast

Production
In May 2019, it was reported that Kat Graham and Alexander Ludwig would star in Operation Christmas Drop for Netflix from a screenplay by Gregg Rossen and Brian Sawyer. Production of the film took place on the U.S. territory of Guam. It is one of the first movies filmed in Guam to receive wide distribution.

Release
Operation Christmas Drop was released on November 5, 2020, by Netflix.

Reception

See also
 List of Christmas films

References

External links
 

2020 films
2020 romantic comedy films
2020s Christmas comedy films
American Christmas comedy films
Films about the United States Air Force
American romantic comedy films
2020s English-language films
English-language Netflix original films
Films set in Guam
Films directed by Martin Wood
2020s American films
Films set in the Federated States of Micronesia